Robert W. "Bo" Welch III (born November 30, 1951) is an American production designer, art director, film and television director and occasional actor. He is best known for his collaborations with directors such as Tim Burton and Barry Sonnenfeld.

Early life
Welch was born in Yardley, Pennsylvania.

Career
Welch worked as a production designer on the Tim Burton films Edward Scissorhands, Beetlejuice and Batman Returns, as well as on the Barry Sonnenfeld films Men in Black and Wild Wild West, among other films. He made his directorial debut with The Cat in the Hat, which was a critical and commercial disappointment. He has been nominated for four Academy Awards for Best Art Direction-Set Decoration, three of them shared with set decorator Cheryl Carasik and another one with J. Michael Riva 
and Linda DeScenna. The four films are Men in Black, The Birdcage, and A Little Princess with Carasik, and The Color Purple with Riva and DeScenna.

Personal life
Welch met actress Catherine O'Hara on the set of Beetlejuice in 1988. They married in 1992 and have two sons: Matthew (born 1994) and Luke (born 1997).

Filmography
As production designer

As art director

As director

As actor

References

External links

1951 births
Living people
American production designers
Best Production Design BAFTA Award winners
Film directors from Pennsylvania
People from Yardley, Pennsylvania
University of Arizona alumni